We're Only Human may refer to:

 We're Only Human (film), 1935 American film directed by James Flood
 We're Only Human (band), a 1980s British powerpop and rock band